Valentin Ivanovich Varennikov (December 15, 1923 – May 6, 2009) was a Soviet/Russian Army general and politician, best known for being one of the planners and leaders of the Soviet–Afghan War, as well as one of the instigators of the 1991 Soviet coup d'état attempt.

Early life
Valentin Varennikov was born to a poor Cossack family in Krasnodar. His father, who fought in the Russian Civil War, graduated from the Moscow industrial institute and was a manager. His mother died in 1930 when he was seven. In 1938, Varennikov lived in Armavir, where he graduated from high school in 1941.

Military career

World War II
In August 1941, Varennikov was drafted by the Armavir city military registration and enlistment office into the ranks of the Red Army. He attended the Cherkassk Infantry School, which was then evacuated to Sverdlovsk following the start of Operation Barbarossa. From October, the first military recruitment began to train. After an accelerated graduation from the school in the summer of 1942, Varennikov was among the few graduates to be appointed the commander of a training platoon in the reserve rifle brigade stationed in Gorky, and only in October 1942 he ended up on the Stalingrad Front as commander of a mortar platoon of 120-mm regimental mortars of the 138th Rifle Division. He fought in the Battle of Stalingrad for 79 days and nights. In November 1942, Varennikov was appointed battery commander, and in December of the same year he participated in the destruction of the encircled units of the German 6th Army commanded by Field Marshal Friedrich Paulus.

In January 1943, he was wounded. After recovering, he returned to duty, enlisted in the operational department of the 35th Guards Rifle Division of the 8th Guards Army. Since March 1943, he was the commander of the mortar battery of the 100th Guards Rifle Regiment, and in the spring of 1944 Varennikov was appointed Deputy Commander of the 100th Guards Rifle Regiment of the 35th Guards Rifle Division of artillery. He participated in the Battle of the Dnieper, and fought for the liberation of Belarus and Poland. When the 8th Guards Army was transferred to the 1st Belorussian Front  Varennikov and his regiment took part in the Operation Bagration. In late July and early August 1944, he entered Polish soil in the Vistula–Oder offensive and fought for the capture of a bridgehead on the Vistula south of Warsaw in Magnuszew. There he was seriously wounded and was treated in a hospital for four months. After his recovery, he returned to the 100th Guards Rifle Regiment of the 35th Guards Rifle Division as deputy regiment commander of artillery, and in mid-January 1945 he participated in the offensive of Soviet troops from the Baltic to the Carpathians. He took part in the battles for the bridgehead in the area of the city of Kustrin on the Oder. In March 1945, Varennikov was wounded for the third time in the battles for Kustrin.

In March 1945, he was assigned as Chief of Artillery of the 101st Guards Rifle Regiment of the 35th Guards Rifle Division. From April to May, Varennikov finished the German–Soviet War in the Battle of Berlin as one of the commanders of the Soviet soldiers who captured the Reichstag.

During the war he was wounded three times and was decorated four times. In June 1945, he took part in the Moscow Victory Parade of 1945 and immediately before the parade, being the chief of the guard of honor, he received the Victory Banner. He ended the war with the rank of captain.

Post war career
Varennikov stayed in East Germany as an officer of the Soviet troops, stationed there until 1950.

In 1954 he graduated from the Frunze Military Academy in Moscow. Later he graduated from the General Staff Academy.  In 1960 he became deputy commander of a motor rifle division. From 1962 to 1966 Varennikov commanded the 54th Motor Rifle Division of the Leningrad Military District. In 1964 armed forces inspectors tested the division, and it was awarded as one of the six top divisions of the Ground Forces of the USSR Armed Forces by order of the Minister of Defence. In August 1965 he was enrolled in the General Staff Academy. From 1967 to 1969 he commanded the 26th Army Corps of the Leningrad Military District.

In 1969 Varennikov took charge of the 3rd Shock Army, and in 1971 he was appointed as the First Deputy Commander-in-Chief of the Group of Soviet Forces in Germany. On 1973, he became the commander of the  Carpathian Military District. 
From 1979 to 1984, he served as the Head of the Main Operations Directorate and First Deputy Chief of the General Staff of the Armed Forces of the USSR.

Between 1984 and 1985, Varennikov worked with the Soviet military mission in Angola, then in the throes of a bloody civil war. In a sharp contrast with the official policy of only permitting Soviet military advisers to serve in non-combat roles, Varennikov supported allowing the advisers to fight alongside their Angolan allies in the event they came under attack. He was the senior Soviet general officer in Angola during Operation Askari, and personally advised Angolan President José Eduardo dos Santos on defensive measures to counter the South African Defence Force's incursion. During the Chernobyl Disaster of 1986, Varennikov was the main organizer of the work of military units in deployment of troops to the location of the catastrophe, to help in recovery efforts.

During the last few years of the Soviet–Afghan War, Varennikov was the personal representative in Kabul of the Soviet Defence Minister and held negotiations with the United Nations Good Offices Mission in Afghanistan and Pakistan members who oversaw the pullout from the country of Soviet troops between 1988 and 1989. Varennikov continued to defend the war even after the Soviet withdrawal in 1989.

In 1989 General Varennikov was named Commander-in-chief of Ground Forces and Deputy Minister of Defence.

Involvement in the August Coup
In 1991, during the August coup attempt he joined forces opposing Soviet leader Mikhail Gorbachev. After the coup's failure General Varennikov was arrested, tried, and prosecuted for treason together with other coup plotters. He was acquitted by the Supreme Court of Russia in 1994, as the court concluded he had merely followed orders and had acted "only in an interest of preserving and strengthening his country". He was the only member of the group of accused plotters who refused to accept an amnesty.

Later life

In 1995 Varennikov, as a member of the Communist Party of the Russian Federation, was elected deputy of the State Duma, the lower house of the Russian parliament. In the Duma Varennikov presided over the Committee on Veterans' Affairs. In 2003 he joined the Rodina bloc as one of its leaders.

In February 2008, Valentin Varennikov was officially accepted as fellow of the Russian Academy of Natural Sciences (Armenian branch) and member of the International Academy Ararat. He was the president and founder of the International League for Human Dignity and Security, an international NGO present in more than 40 countries.

In May 2005, Varennikov travelled to China and participated in the launch of the Chinese version of his book Man, War and Dream, at the Russian Embassy in Beijing. Although Varennikov has been to China before, he has a deep love for the Chinese people.

In the preface to the Chinese version of the book, he wrote:

"I have five reasons to love China: first, the Chinese people are outstanding people, and China has a long history and culture; second, she has an amazing development rate today; third, the Chinese people have never threatened anyone, but the Chinese people have been brought to them by the aggressors. However, he finally defeated the aggressor and embarked on the road of national independence. Fourth, China is our great neighbor, and China and Russia have traditional friendship. Fifth, the Chinese leaders trained by the Communist Party of China led the Chinese people to find the right direction of development in the world economic development system.

Varennikov was one of Russia's most outspoken defenders of Joseph Stalin. During 2008, Varennikov presented the case for Stalin as Russia's greatest historical figure on the Name of Russia television project. Stalin won third place. According to Varennikov: "We became a great country because we were led by Stalin."

Personal life
Varennikov was married to Elena-Olga Tikhonovna (1923-2005). They had two sons. One of his sons, Vladimir Varennikov, is a retired lieutenant general in the Russian Ground Forces, an Afghan war veteran and also a Rodina deputy in the Russian Parliament (Duma).

Valentin Varennikov lived in Moscow, where he died on May 6, 2009, aged 85, at the Main Military Clinical Hospital named after N.N.Burdenko following complications after a complex operation performed in January 2009 at the S.M. Kirov Military Medical Academy in St. Petersburg. He is buried with full military honors at the Troyekurovskoye Cemetery in Moscow.

Awards and honors
USSR and Russia

Foreign

References
This article incorporates material from Russian Wikipedia

External links
 CNN interview with Gen. Valentin Varennikov - A CNN Perspective Series, Episode 20: Soldiers of God.
 Valentin Varennikov personal site - in Russian.
 Valentin Varennikov-Daily Telegraph obituary

1923 births
2009 deaths
People from Krasnodar
Communist Party of the Russian Federation members
Russian communists
Chernobyl liquidators
Burials in Troyekurovskoye Cemetery
Heroes of the Soviet Union
Army generals (Soviet Union)
Soviet military personnel of World War II
Soviet military personnel of the Soviet–Afghan War
People of the Angolan Civil War
People of the South African Border War
People of the 1991 Soviet coup d'état attempt
Rodina (political party) politicians
Frunze Military Academy alumni
Recipients of the Order of Military Merit (Russia)
Recipients of the Order of Lenin
Recipients of the Order of the Red Banner
Recipients of the Order of Kutuzov, 1st class
Recipients of the Medal of Zhukov
Recipients of the Patriotic Order of Merit in silver
Recipients of the Order of the Red Star
Recipients of the Order "For Service to the Homeland in the Armed Forces of the USSR", 3rd class
Commanders with Star of the Order of Polonia Restituta
21st-century Russian politicians
Military Academy of the General Staff of the Armed Forces of the Soviet Union alumni
Second convocation members of the State Duma (Russian Federation)
Fourth convocation members of the State Duma (Russian Federation)